Railings is a retired Australian Thoroughbred racehorse who is most notable for winning the 2005 Caulfield Cup when trained by John Hawkes.

He was later transferred to New Zealand trainer Roger James in the Spring of 2007 and finished his racing career under trainer Michael Maroney.

Railings retired from racing in December 2008 and started a career in show jumping and dressage events.

References

2001 racehorse births
Thoroughbred family 3-l
Racehorses trained in Australia
Racehorses bred in Australia

Caulfield Cup winners